Marko Mrkić (born 20 August 1996) is a Serbian footballer, who plays as a forward for Napredak Kruševac. He is a son of Saša Mrkić.

International career
Mrkić was called by coach Slavoljub Muslin in the Serbia national football team in January 2017. On 29 January 2017, Mrkić made his international debut for the Serbia national football team in a friendly match against United States in a 0–0 away draw in San Diego.

References

External links
 Player profile on Serbian National Team page
 
 Marko Mrkić stats at utakmica.rs
 

1996 births
Living people
Sportspeople from Niš
Association football forwards
Serbian footballers
FK Radnički Niš players
FK Napredak Kruševac players
Serbian SuperLiga players
Serbia youth international footballers
Serbia international footballers